Ja'Marcus Bradley (born December 11, 1996) is an American football wide receiver for the Pittsburgh Steelers of the National Football League (NFL). He played college football at Louisiana.

Early life and high school
Bradley grew up in Ackerman, Mississippi and attended Choctaw County High School. He played quarterback and passed for 1,437 yards and nine touchdowns while also rushing for 2,606 yards on 247 carries with 47 touchdowns as a senior.

College career
Bradley was a member of the Louisiana Ragin' Cajuns for five seasons, redshirting as a true freshman. He was named third-team All-Sun Belt Conference as a redshirt junior after finishing the season with 40 receptions for 608 yards and 10 touchdowns. Bradley was named second-team All-Sun Belt as a redshirt senior after catching 60 passes for 906 yards and 10 touchdowns. Bradley finished his collegiate career fourth in school history with 160 receptions and 2,359 receiving yards and second with 23 touchdown receptions.

Professional career

Cleveland Browns
Bradley was signed by the Cleveland Browns as an undrafted free agent on April 26, 2020. He was waived during final roster cuts on September 5, 2020, and signed to the team's practice squad two days later. He was elevated to the active roster on December 5, December 14, and December 26 for the team's weeks 13, 14, and 16 games against the Tennessee Titans, Baltimore Ravens, and New York Jets, and reverted to the practice squad after each game. Bradley was elevated again on January 9, 2021, for the team's wild card playoff game against the Pittsburgh Steelers, and reverted to the practice squad again following the game.

Bradley signed a reserve/futures contract with the Browns on January 18, 2021. Bradley was waived by the Browns on August 31, 2021. Bradley was re-signed to the Browns' practice squad on September 1, 2021. Bradley was signed to the Browns' active roster on November 9, 2021. Bradley was waived by the Browns on December 11, 2021, and re-signed to their practice squad on December 14, 2021, but promoted back to the active roster the next day.

The Browns placed an exclusive-rights free agent tender on Bradley on March 7, 2022. Bradley was waived by the Browns on August 29, 2022.

Pittsburgh Steelers
On November 23, 2022, Bradley was signed to the Pittsburgh Steelers practice squad. He signed a reserve/future contract on January 10, 2023.

References

External links
Louisiana Ragin' Cajuns bio
Cleveland Browns bio

1996 births
Living people
American football wide receivers
Cleveland Browns players
Players of American football from Mississippi
Louisiana Ragin' Cajuns football players
People from Ackerman, Mississippi
African-American players of American football
21st-century African-American sportspeople
Pittsburgh Steelers players